William McGirt (born June 21, 1979) is an American professional golfer who plays on the PGA Tour.

College career
Born in Lumberton, North Carolina, McGirt grew up playing both baseball and golf, receiving scholarship offers from colleges in North Carolina and South Carolina. After being recruited by multiple colleges for both sports, McGirt decided to play college golf at Wofford College in Spartanburg, South Carolina. He was the 1998 Southern Conference Freshman of the Year and won three collegiate events for the Terriers, including the 2001 conference championship. He graduated in 2001 and was a 2010 inductee of the Wofford College Athletic Hall of Fame.

Professional career
McGirt turned professional in 2004 and spent several years playing on mini-tours. His first break came by reaching the final stage of the 2009 PGA Tour Qualifying Tournament (Q-School), allowing him to play on the Nationwide Tour in 2010. He ended 2010 at 34th on that tour's money list, then finished runner-up at Q-School to earn his PGA Tour card for 2011. McGirt qualified for the FedEx Cup Playoffs in his rookie season, advancing as far as the Deutsche Bank Championship and finishing 83rd in the FedEx Cup standings. He finished 141st on the 2011 PGA Tour money list. Unfortunately, it was the money list that mattered at the time and McGirt had to go back to Q School to regain his Tour privileges or be relegated to the conditional category. He qualified for the tour in 2012 by finishing T13 in the 2011 Q-School.

McGirt's first appearance in a major was at the PGA Championship in 2012, where he missed the cut. He had three runner-up finishes before his first win at age 36 in June 2016 at the Memorial Tournament in Ohio. He won on the second hole of a sudden-death playoff with Jon Curran. It was McGirt's first professional win since his mini-tour victory nine years earlier in 2007. He earned $1.53 million for winning the Memorial, almost 100 times more than the $16,000 prize for his mini-tour win. The win earned him a three-year PGA Tour exemption, moved him to 44th in the Official World Golf Ranking, and qualified him for the U.S. Open, PGA Championship, and the Masters. McGirt also qualified for the 2016 Open Championship based on his FedEx Cup position. His career high world ranking is 38th, after a T10 at the 2016 PGA Championship.

McGirt's 2018 season ended at The Northern Trust. He had surgery on his left hip and did not play the 2018–19 season. He entered the 2019–20 season with 29 starts and 375.582 points to meet the terms of his medical extension, but could not meet the requirements. McGirt failed to regain his PGA Tour card for 2022, but was one of five players who were not already exempt (26-75th Korn Ferry Tour standings or 126-150th FedEx Cup) to earn a "Floor of Five" exemption and full Korn Ferry Tour privileges for 2023.

As of 2022, William has more than 50 top 25 finishes and has earned more than eleven million dollars.

Amateur wins (2)
2003 Cardinal Amateur, North Carolina Amateur

Professional wins (2)

PGA Tour wins (1)

PGA Tour playoff record (1–0)

Tarheel Tour wins (1)
2007 Cabarrus Classic

Results in major championships

CUT = missed the half-way cut
"T" indicates a tie for a place

Summary

Most consecutive cuts made – 3 (2016 PGA – 2017 U.S. Open)
Longest streak of top-10s – 1

Results in The Players Championship

CUT = missed the halfway cut
"T" indicates a tie for a place

Results in World Golf Championships

QF, R16, R32, R64 = Round in which player lost in match play
"T" = Tied

FedEx Cup final standing

See also
2010 PGA Tour Qualifying School graduates
2011 PGA Tour Qualifying School graduates

References

External links

Wofford College Athletics Hall of Fame – William McGirt

American male golfers
PGA Tour golfers
Golfers from North Carolina
Golfers from South Carolina
Wofford College alumni
People from Lumberton, North Carolina
Sportspeople from Spartanburg, South Carolina
People from Boiling Springs, South Carolina
1979 births
Living people